The 2004–05 New Zealand V8 season (the leading motorsport category in New Zealand) consisted of seven rounds beginning on 16–17 October 2004 and ending 15–17 April 2005. Defending champion Andy Booth held on to take his second New Zealand V8 championship in succession.

Teams and drivers

Calendar

Points structure
Points for the 2004/2005 championship are allocated as follows:

Drivers standings

References

NZ Touring Cars Championship seasons
V8 season
V8 season